The L.D. Hickerson House is a historic house in Tullahoma, Tennessee. It was built in 1895 for Lytle David Hickerson, the founding  president of the McMinnville & Manchester Railroad and the First National Bank. It was designed in the Stick-Eastlake style. It has been listed on the National Register of Historic Places since August 18, 1993.

References

National Register of Historic Places in Coffee County, Tennessee
Queen Anne architecture in Tennessee
Houses completed in 1895
1895 establishments in Tennessee